Ulziibayar Duurenbayar (born 31 January 1994) is a Mongolian judoka.

He participated at the 2018 World Judo Championships, winning a medal.

References

External links
 

1994 births
Living people
Mongolian male judoka
Asian Games medalists in judo
Judoka at the 2014 Asian Games
Judoka at the 2018 Asian Games
Asian Games silver medalists for Mongolia
Medalists at the 2014 Asian Games
Medalists at the 2018 Asian Games
Judoka at the 2020 Summer Olympics
Olympic judoka of Mongolia
21st-century Mongolian people
20th-century Mongolian people